Rauni Ikäheimo (21 July 1924 – 28 July 1997) was a Finnish film actress. She appeared in twelve films between 1951 and 1993.

Selected filmography
 The Harvest Month (1956)
 Uuno Turhapuro (1973)

External links

 Meri, Lauri: Näyttelijät sodan varjossa. Otava, 2005. .

1924 births
1997 deaths
People from Imatra
Finnish film actresses
20th-century Finnish actresses